The Constitution of Arkansas is the primary organizing law for the U.S. state of Arkansas delineating the duties, powers, structures, and functions of the state government. Arkansas' original constitution was adopted at a constitutional convention held at Little Rock in advance of the territory's admission to the Union in 1836. The current constitution was ratified in 1874 following the Brooks–Baxter War.

The Brooks–Baxter War and passage of the new constitution are considered to mark the end of Reconstruction in Arkansas. This was two years before the disputed 1876 U.S. presidential election and national compromise that resulted in the Republican government withdrawing federal troops from the South. The state has passed numerous amendments to the 1874 Constitution – 102 as of 2020.

By gaining passage of the Election Law of 1891 and a poll tax amendment in the general election of 1892, the Democratic Party consolidated its control of state politics over Republicans and a farmer-labor coalition; effectively disenfranchising most African Americans. By 1895 there were none in the state house; their exclusion from politics lasted for decades deep into the 20th century.

Background

1836 Constitution
In 1833, Arkansas was eager to be admitted as a state, although Congress was hesitant to admit another pro-slavery state due to the tense equality achieved under the Missouri Compromise. The territory elected delegates for a state constitutional convention. Territorial governor, William Fulton tried to halt the convention, but Attorney General, Benjamin F. Butler ruled the assemblage legal. The first state constitution was ratified by Congress on January 30, 1836, and on June 15 of that year, President Andrew Jackson signed the act making Arkansas the 25th state.

American Civil War

1861 Constitution
The first constitution was vague and short. It was replaced by the second Arkansas state constitution when Arkansas seceded from the Union on May 6, 1861. This constitution was very similar to the original except for its references to The Confederate States of America.

1864 Constitution
Arkansas adopted a new Constitution on March 18, 1864, after the 1863 Emancipation Proclamation. This constitution stipulated that federal recognition and support would resume after ten percent of 1860 voters took the oath of allegiance to the union. Slavery was abolished in this constitution, but there was no provision as to civil rights for freedmen, or former slaves. This constitution was passed in an effort to complete Reconstruction and return power to local governments as quickly as possible. This was the first constitution to define election procedures for a number of important posts within the state government.

1868 Constitution
Congress's 1867 Reconstruction Acts followed passage of the 13th and 14th Amendments emancipating slaves and making them citizens. The 1867 Acts required former Confederate states to recognize former slaves as citizens, and to adopt constitutions providing suffrage for freedmen.

In late 1867 Arkansas elected delegates to a new Constitutional Convention, which took place in early 1868 in the old capital building in Little Rock.  At that Convention, the delegates drafted a new Constitution. It was adopted by popular referendum in the spring of 1868. That June Arkansas became the first rebel state to be readmitted to the Union under the Reconstruction Acts. The Constitution of 1868 made racial discrimination illegal; provided suffrage (voting) rights for freedmen age 21 and older; provided for public schools for the first time, for both black and white children; and it established a state university.

History
The fifth and current constitution was adopted in 1874. Democrats regained control of the state legislature for the first time since the Civil War. They spent a summer re-writing the constitution. This version reflects attitudes related to the war and its aftermath. The delegates gave the most power to county governments, including for legal issues, transportation, taxation and spending. The power of the governor was significantly curtailed. State officials' terms were dropped from four years to two years, and more state positions were required to be filled by popular election, rather than appointment by the governor. This is the constitution that the state uses today, with some 87 amendments and various other changes.
Arkansas held constitutional conventions in 1918, 1969, and 1979, called the Sixth, Seventh, and Eight Constitutional Conventions, respectively. None of these drafts were ratified. Arkansas has passed numerous amendments - 102 at last count.

Original frame

Preamble
We, the People of the State of Arkansas, grateful to Almighty God for the privilege of choosing our own form of government; for our civil and religious liberty; and desiring to perpetuate its blessings, and secure the same to our selves and posterity; do ordain and establish this Constitution.

Article I
This article establishes the boundaries of Arkansas as running from the Mississippi river on the east to the Oklahoma and Texas borders on the west, and bound by Missouri in the north and Louisiana in the south. This article also defines the seat of government as being in Little Rock.

Article II
For the most part, this article affirms the same limits to the State Government that are similarly constrained by the US Constitution to the Government of the United States.

Article III
Article 3 mandates that all elections shall be fair and equal. No person shall be denied the right to vote. Any resident citizen over the age of 18 may register and vote. Electors are exempt from arrest while they are traveling to and from elections. Soldiers may not vote on the basis of being stationed in Arkansas: they must establish residency through other means.

Article IV
This article states that there will be 3 branches of government, legislative, judicial, and executive.

Article V
Article 5 provides for the operations of the Arkansas General Assembly. It requires the Assembly to meet biennially (Section 5) and limits these meetings to 60 days unless otherwise approved by two-thirds of both houses (Section 17). Section 4 sets the qualifications for members. Amendment 86 allows for biennial fiscal sessions in even-numbered years; these sessions are limited to legislative deliberation regarding the state budget, though other issues may be brought before the houses via approval of a two-thirds vote of the membership.

Section 1 allows for passage of laws or constitutional amendments by initiative. Petitions require signatures equal to eight percent of registered voters to appear on the ballot for a law, or ten percent for a constitutional amendment (see below). Section 1 also allows, by six percent of voters placing a petition, for a statewide referendum on any law or any part of a law. The petition must be filed no later than 90 days after final adjournment of the Assembly. The law is suspended until it is voted on in the next election; if part of a law, the portion subject to referendum is suspended while all other provisions remain in effect.

It also includes highly restrictive provisions regarding appropriations:
Section 30 requires that the "general appropriations bill" be limited to the "ordinary expenses of the executive, legislative, and judicial departments of the State". All other appropriations must be passed by special appropriations bills. However, each bill can embrace only one subject; thus, hundreds of bills must be passed to fund other State agencies.
Section 38 requires, in order to raise "property, excise, privilege or personal taxes ... now levied", either 1) approval of the voters or 2) a three-fourths majority of the legislature. However, since Arkansas' sales tax was added after passage of the Section (which was added by Amendment), it does not fall under the "now levied" provision, and thus can be increased by a simple majority.
Section 39 places restrictions on funding. Except for "educational purposes, highway purposes, to pay Confederate pensions and the just debts of the State", no appropriations exceeding $2.5 million can be passed without a three-fourths majority. In recent years, this means that nearly every appropriation bill (including the general bill) requires such.
Section 40 further requires that the general appropriations bill must be passed before any special appropriations bill can be passed. Otherwise, no appropriations are valid.

An example of how the restrictions can wreak havoc took place in 1989, when the general appropriations bill (which far exceeded $2.5 million) failed to gain the required three-fourths majority, but was "declared passed" by the General Assembly under the "just debts of the State" exemption, and all subsequent special appropriations bills were passed thereafter. However, the Arkansas Supreme Court disagreed with the Assembly's use of the just debts provision. As a result, it declared every single appropriations bill of the session unconstitutional—the general bill did not receive the votes needed to pass under Section 39, and under Section 40 all other appropriations bills were invalid since the general bill must be passed first—requiring the Assembly to return in special session to reenact them.

Appropriations do not constitute the state budget in Arkansas; that is enacted near the end of the session, when the Revenue Stabilization Law, which provides the mechanism for distributing the state's revenue (even general revenues), is amended to reflect the submitted budget. Any appropriation not funded by the Revenue Stabilization Law is essentially null and void. Some observers believe that the Revenue Stabilization Act, while strict in its implementation, has prevented the state from suffering the financial difficulties of other states with less-strict preventive measures to avoid deficit spending.

Amending the Constitution
The current Constitution allows for two methods of amendment. However, each method is shown in a separate section.

Under Section 22 of Article 19, either house of the General Assembly may propose amendments. The amendment requires majority approval of both houses in a recorded vote, publication in at least one newspaper in each county for six months prior to the next election of the Assembly, and majority approval of the voters. However, the Section places further restrictions on legislative amendments, requiring each amendment to appear separately on the ballot and limiting the number per ballot to three.

Under Section 1 of Article 5 (as amended by Amendment 7), ten percent of legal voters may propose an amendment by initiative, requiring majority approval of the voters. The proposed amendment must be filed with the Arkansas Secretary of State not less than four months before the election, and 30 days prior to the election the petitioners (at their own expense) must publish the amendment "in some paper of general circulation". Unlike legislative amendments, there are no limits on the number of amendments by initiative that may be proposed on any one ballot.

Ratified amendments
In addition to the 20 Articles listed above, 102 amendments have been added. Though some amendments have been physically incorporated into the text of the Constitution (e.g. Amendment 1, adding Article 20 and Amendment 90, incorporated changes made to Amendment 82), others remain physically separate from the text.

Notable amendments shown separately include:
Amendment to establish a Poll tax be paid as a requirement for voter registration. Passed in 1892, this amendment together with the Election Law of 1891 strengthened Democratic Party power. The Election Law centralized power at the state election board, in contrast to other efforts to decentralize power in the state as represented in the constitution.
Amendment 34, which provides for the right to work (only Arizona, Florida, Mississippi, and Oklahoma have similar constitutional provisions).
Amendment 35, § 1: Creation of the Arkansas Game and Fish Commission.
Amendment 44, which allowed the government to nullify Federal integration laws. Overturned on 1989 by a Federal court, a referendum in the following year, 1990 Arkansas Amendment 3, deleted this amendment.
Amendment 46, which allows for horse racing pari-mutuel betting, but only in Hot Springs, the location of Oaklawn Park (there is no similar constitutional amendment relating to dog racing, though Southland Greyhound Park operates in West Memphis.)
Amendment 68, which states that "[t]he policy of Arkansas is to protect the life of every unborn child from conception to birth, to the extent permitted by the Federal Constitution." This provision allows Arkansas to restrict the practice of abortion, now that Roe v. Wade has been overturned by the United States Supreme Court.
Amendment 73, which places term limits on Arkansas officeholders. Section 3 also placed limits on Arkansas's Congressional delegation, but it was found unconstitutional by the U.S. Supreme Court in U.S. Term Limits, Inc. v. Thornton (1995), which ruled that states could not pass laws for Congressional officeholders that were more restrictive than those in the US Constitution. Section 4 placed a severability clause so the remainder of the amendment would remain in force.
Amendment 75 (Environmental Enhancement Funds) to the constitution provides an additional excise tax of one-eighth of one percent (1 /8 of 1%) with forty-five percent of the proceeds to be allocated to the Arkansas Game and Fish Commission's "Game Protection Fund".

Amendment 83 Denies recognition to all forms of same-sex unions.
Amendment 84 Authorizes bingo and raffles for charitable purposes. Passed in 2006
Amendment 86 Authorizes the General Assembly to meet in general sessions in odd-numbered years and fiscal sessions during even-numbered years
Amendment 87 Authorizes a statewide lottery. Passed in 2008.
Amendment 88 Guarantees the right of Arkansans to hunt, fish and trap. Passed in 2010.

Criticisms
Section 13 originally set the state's usury limit at 10%; it was amended in the early 1980s to 5% above the Federal Reserve Discount Rate on 90-day commercial paper (see the latest rates), but falling interest rates and poorly worded provisions made the amended version more onerous than the original. For example, a clause in the 1980s amendment appears to set a 17% limit for consumer loans; but since they were not exempted from the main "5% above discount rate" provision, the courts ruled that the limit for consumer loans was the lesser of the two clauses, usually the 5% rule. Also, other language in the amendment applying the usury limit "at the time of the contract" made floating-rate loans extremely difficult, even though the usury limit was a floating rate. Neither the original nor amended provisions allowed the legislature to make any exceptions to the general usury law, as happened in other states. The Arkansas legislature tried to permit payday loans anyway, but after two adverse decisions in 2008, the Attorney General ordered all payday lenders in the state to shut down.

After out-of-state banks took over most lending in Arkansas, banks located in the state received special relief from the usury law through Section 731 of the Federal Gramm-Leach-Bliley Act in 1999. Also in that year, an Arkansas Supreme Court decision allowed out-of-state auto finance companies to engage in subprime lending through Arkansas dealerships without violating the usury law. Today, only a handful of loans made to Arkansans are still subject to this law, mainly private-party lending and some prime auto loans from companies such as GMAC and Ford Credit.

This unique and unusual article (added by Amendment 1) prohibits the General Assembly from making appropriations for payment of principal and interest on several bond issues from 1869 to 1871, commonly referred to as Holford bonds. They were passed during Reconstruction by the General Assembly. Some of the bonds refinanced disputed debt outstanding from shortly after Arkansas' statehood in 1836. These bonds had been central to the Brooks-Baxter War.

Article 19 in Section 1, titled "Atheists disqualified from holding office or testifying as witness", states "No person who denies the being of a God shall hold any office in the civil departments of this State, nor be competent to testify as a witness in any court."

This is also inconsistent with Section 26 in Article 2, which states that no religious test shall be applied as a requirement to vote or hold office - Article 19 in Section 1 would be classified as such, but there are no known cases of this article being enforced in modern times. Further, since religious freedom is provided for in the United States Constitution's Bill of Rights, any attempt to do so would be struck down in court.

In addition, Article Six of the United States Constitution is also considered to prohibit such religious tests: "no religious Test shall ever be required as a Qualification to any Office or public Trust under the United States." Not only does the wording of this amendment specifically bar Congress from restricting freedom of religion, but current legal precedent holds that these provisions and the rest of the United States Bill of Rights are binding on the states under the Liberty Clause of the 14th Amendment to the federal Constitution.

References

Further reading

External links

 

1874 documents
1874 establishments in Arkansas
1874 in American law
1874 in American politics
Arkansas law
Government of Arkansas
Politics of Arkansas
Arkansas